Elavumthitta (also Elavinthitta, Elavanthitta) is a town (located near to the border of Alappuzha and Pathanamthitta district) in Pathanamthitta district of Kerala, India. The majority of its inhabitants are from Hindu and Christian backgrounds. The primary crops are rubber, coconut, black pepper and plantain. The terrain is hilly with plenty of paddy fields in between. It is the commercial centre of Mezhuveli and Chenneerkara panchayaths.

Geography And Transportation
Elavumthitta is nearly 12 km from the district headquarter Pathanamthitta.Other nearby Towns are, Chengannur (14.5 km), Pandalam (8 km), Kozhencherry (11 km) and Adoor (14 km).

 Nearest Railway Station = Chengannur Railway station (15 km)
[Other nearby Railway Stations: Cheriyanad Railway Station (19 km), Mavelikara railway Station (25 km), Thrivulla Railway Station (26 km), Kayamkulam junction (34 km).]
 Nearest Police Station = Elavumthitta Police station.
 Nearest Airport = Thiruvananthapuram International Airport (107 km), Nedumbassery International Airport (130 km)

Two main roads passes through Elavumthitta. One is Pathanamthitta – Elavumthitta – Chengannur. KSRTC is running chain service through this road. The other road is Adoor – Elavumthitta – Kozhencherry road.

This peak can be considered as the highest spot in the area. There is a legend about this peak that the pandavas in exile visited this place and stayed here for a short while. There were giant size foot marks imprinted on rocks scattered above the hill believed to be of Bhima the mighty bare hand warrior of Mahabharat epic. And also there was a pit on the rock with perennial source of water; signs reinforcing the local beliefs.

Elavumthitta is the catchment area of two major rivers, the Sacred Pampa and Achankovil. The abundant rainfall in the region supplements these two rivers for keeping the river not drying in summer season, and in return the two rivers keep this region abundant in ground water and save Elavumthitta from droughts. Almost every house got open wells for its water requirement. People of Elavumthitta never experienced a drought or flood situation in their life.  Pamba river is in the north, 8 km away and Elavumthitta is in a much higher elevation; hence there is no flood in this region. The same thing is with Achankovil river, which is 5 km away in the western side of Elavumthitta. Elavumthitta was abundant in Streams and lush green paddy fields. There was a time; one could stand on a higher spot and enjoy the sight of endless coconut tree tops spreading its leaves and swaying in gentle breeze, a very pleasant sight indeed.

Major townships around Elavumthitta

1. Geographic location.
Northwest = Chengannur (14.5 km)
North     = Thiruvalla (23.9 km), Kozhenchery (11 km), Aranmula (10.5 km)
Northeast = Ranni (20.5 km)
West      = Mavelikkara (25 km)
Centre    = Elavumthitta
East      = Pathanamthitta (12 km)
Southwest = Pandalam (8 km)
South     = Adoor (14 km)
Southeast = Omalloor (8 km)

2. Cites.
Kottayam (50 km)
Thiruvananthapuram (100 km)
Kochi (111 km)
Alapuzha (58 km)
Kollam (58 km)

Rainfall

Elavumthitta does not have its own rain gauge, but the area is in the close proximity of Pathanamthitta, which is 12 km. away and has a Rain gauge. The rain fall data for the past few years is given below in mm .

Sources
 Agricultural Statistics – (Website Panchayat level statistics-2011; Pathanamthitta District)
 India Metrological Department

The average annual rainfall is calculated from the above data which comes to 2700 mm

History and Culture

Elavumthitta Market celebrated its centenary year in 2009. In the year of 1909 Mooloor S Padmanabha Panicker Who was a member of 'Sreemoolam Prajasabha' had established the Elavumthitta market in the 2 acres (8,100 m2) of land near the Elavumthitta Junction. He named the market as "Sreemoolam Rajagopalavilasam".

Aswathy Festival
The most important annual festival for the people of Elavumthitta is the Celebration of Aswathy in the Malayalam month of meenam. No doubt Onam is the biggest festival of every Keralite, but this Asawathy celebration is exclusively for the People of Elavumthitta. Every child in Elavumthitta will be waiting for this occasion; the tips he gets now and then- let the sum may be a meager one- is kept as his secret treasure; reserved for this great day. He has to buy many items. The seasonal crops of cashew is of great help; cashew picked up from here and there is sold and the amount may be a pittance in today's standard, but the thrill of spending it in the aswathy fair is something one will remember till his death.

Cattle market

Elavumthitta market popularly known as Elavumthitta Chantha (ഇലവുംതിട്ട ചന്ത) celebrated its 100th year in September 2009. The Cattle market is open on the 9th and 22nd of every Malayalam month.
There is an important landmark in the middle of Elavumthitta- a huge banyan tree. How old the tree is, nobody knows, eight hundred years or more that is anybody's guess. Some say it is more than that. One thing is certain, that it gave shelter to generations of weary travelers, it witnessed the political changes of Kerala, listening fiery speeches of politicians who make makeshift stage on its platform now and then; unaffected by either political speeches or religious sermons; stand there majestically giving shelter to birds on its long branches with thick green foliage and feeding its seasonal fruits to the needy birds.

First Sivagiri Pilgrimage
With the blessings of Sree Narayana Guru, five young bloods of Elavumthitta started the first 'Sivagiri Theertdhadanam' in the year 1932.
In 1928 January 16 – the decision to start 'Sivagiri Theerdthadanam' was approved by Sri Narayana Guru
It was decided to start the first pilgrimage from Elavumthitta. The S N D P unit No.76 of Elavumthitta selected 5 youngsters for the pilgrimage. Those 5 'Manjakkilikal' were:

 P.K.Divakara Panicker – Son of Mooloor.S.Padmanabha Panicker
 P.K.Kesavan – Plavunilkkunnathil
 P.V.Raghavan – Ayathil Melepurathootu Veetil
 M.K.Raghavan – Ayathil Edayilekizhakkethil
 S.Sankunni – Thekkeveetil

The team was led by Sri.P.K.Divakara Panicker. This was a historical journey that led to the famous Sivagiri pilgrimage conducted every year. Now thousands of devotees are following their path. The pilgrimage has become an occasion of unity and peace.

Mooloor S. Padmanābha Panicker
Mooloor S. Padmanābha Panicker (Sarasa kavi Mooloor) was one of the great poets and a prominent social reform activist from Travancore. He was born at Panayannaarkavu, close to the town of Mannar in Central Travancore in 1869 (Malayalam year Kumbhom 27, 1044 ). He named his residence in Elavumthitta as 'Kerala Varma Soudham' as a mark of respect towards Kerala Varma Valiyakoyi Thampuran who was his close friend.

Arts and sports

People of Elavumthitta had no entertainment in earlier days other than the "Aswathi Maholsvam" celebrated once a year. Cinema halls are 10 to 20 km away. Convenient bus service to reach the cinema hall in time for the show or to come back from the show were not available then. Still some tough adventurists used to trek all the way to Pathanamthitta, Pandalam, Kozhencherry, or Chengannur wherever the popular pictures were shown.
Elavumthitta Cultural Club – ECC Affiliation number (ptm/tc/202/2018)
Mooloor Jyothis Arts & Sports Club, Ayathil (affiliation no. C-001)
Azad Arts & Sports Club, Elavumthitta (affiliation no. C-002)
Sariga Arts & Sports Club, Planthottathukala (affiliation no. C-004)
Sangeetha Arts Club, Nediyakala (affiliation no. C-006)
Sahridaya Vedi, Sahridaya Nagar (affiliation no. C-007)
Janasakthi Sports Club, Nediyakala (affiliation no. C-008)
Suvarna Kala Samskarika Samithi, Ayathil (affiliation no. C-010)
Soorya Arts &Sports Club, Muttathukonam
 Dr Ambedkar Memorial Aksharakala Samskarika Kendram Poovanmala Junction

Libraries in and around Elavumthitta
 Dr. Ambedkar Memorial Aksharakala Samskarika Kendram Library
 Menon Smaraka Grandhasala, Nediyakala, Mezhuveli
 Janatha Library and Reading Room, Muttathukonam

Educational institutions

Sreebuddha College of Engineering (now mixed)
Salvation Army L P school, Thumpamon North – This is the first School of Elavumthitta, established in the year 1903. It celebrated its Centenary year in 2003. The land for the school was donated by Sri Neelakanta Pillai of Alakkatu. Incidentally he was also the first headmaster of the School. The school is located 1 km away from Elavumthitta market on the way side of Ramanchira road. 
S N Giri S N D P H S S Chenneerkkara
S N D P H S S, Muttathukonam North 
CMS high School, Kuzhikkala
Sree Narayana Guru College of Advanced Studies, Mezhuveli
Padmanabhodayam H S S, Mezhuveli
Gangadhara Vilasam L P School, Mezhuveli
Teachers Training Institute, Mezhuveli
Govt. Model L P School, Mezhuveli North
U P School, Mezhuveli North
S N Govt. L P School, Kooduvettikkal, Karithotta
Govt. Of India Women's I T I, Elavumthitta
Sarasakavi Mooloor Smaraka U P School, Chandanakkunnu
Ambedkar English Medium School, Konganal buildings, near Melathemukku.
Mezhuveli Panchayat I T C
CMS U P School, Nallanikunnu
 Kendriya Vidyalaya, Chenneerkara

Temples and Churches in and around Elavumthitta
Elavumthitta Bhagavathy Temple
Elavumthitta Malanada
Ayathil Malanada
Mezhuveli Anandabhootheshawaram Temple
Aranmula Sree Parthasarathi Temple
Omalloor Raktha Kanda Swamy Temple
Pandalam Valiya Koickal Sree Dharma Sastha Temple
Kulakkada SivaParavathi Temple
Christ The King Catholic Church Elavumthitta, Punalur Diocese. Established on 4 November 1936.
Kuzhikkala Marthoma Church
Manjinikkara Church
Bethlehem Marthomma Church
India Pentecostal Church of God
The Pentecostal Mission 
St. Paul's CSI Church, Nallanikunnu
Malankara Catholic Church
Sehion Mar Thoma Church
St Thomas Marthoma Church (Pulinthitta Church)
Thabor Mar Thoma Church Pullamala
Jarusalem Mar Thoma Church Ayathil
Ebenezer Marthoma Church Chenneerkara
Thachirethu Vettiyil Sree Nagaraja Nagayakshi kavu

Writers / Litterateurs
Mooloor S Padmanabha Panicker
Kambisseri Karunakaran

Demographics
Elavumthitta is flanked by the area of 4 panchayats. Following data is from the book 'Panchayat level Statistics 2006' published by Department of Economics & Statistics Thiruvananthapuram.

Elavumthitta is spread in four Panchayats namely Mezhuveli, Chenneerkkara, Kulanada and Elanthoor. The total households in Elavumthitta is 7,988 and population is 32,399. The literacy of Elavumthitta area is 94.70%.

Dairy farming is common here.

See also
 Mooloor S.Padmanabha Panicker
 Veena George MLA, Aranmula
 Adv.V.K Varghese (Ex. MLA, pathanamthitta)
 K. C. Rajagopalan (EX. MLA, Aranmula)
 P. N. Chandrasenan (Ex. MLA, Aranmula)
 Kambisseri Karunakaran (Chief Editor Janayugam)
 Prof. Sasikumar (Chairman Sree Buddha Group of Institutions)
 S.N. Vijayan (former National Vice President Ezhava Mahajana Sabha)
 Chengannur
 Pandalam
 Alapuzha district
 Chengannur Railway
 Madambi, a 2008 Malayalam film which was shot here

References

External links

 www.facebook.com/elavinthitta

 https://pathanamthitta.nic.in/
 https://www.thehindu.com/todays-paper/tp-national/tp-kerala/elavumthitta-the-birthplace-of-sivagiri-pilgrimage/article4271637.ece

Villages in Pathanamthitta district